Thomas John Cook (May 7, 1907 – October 2, 1961) was a Canadian professional ice hockey forward who played 348 games in the National Hockey League with the Chicago Black Hawks and Montreal Maroons between 1929 and 1938. He won the Stanley Cup with Chicago in 1934. Cook was born in Fort William, Ontario

Career statistics

Regular season and playoffs

Awards and achievements
 Stanley Cup Championship (1934)

External links
 

1907 births
1961 deaths
Canadian ice hockey centres
Chicago Blackhawks players
Cleveland Falcons players
Ice hockey people from Ontario
Sportspeople from Thunder Bay
Manitoba Bisons ice hockey players
Montreal Maroons players
New Haven Eagles players
Stanley Cup champions
Tulsa Oilers (AHA) players